Coleochaetaceae is a family of algae. It is the only family in the Coleochaetales, an order of parenchymous charophyte algae, that includes some of the closest multicellular relatives of land plants.  
They questionably include the fossil genus Parka.

References

Charophyta
Green algae orders